Wendy Napier (born 1 October 1957) is an Australian former cricketer who played as a right-handed batter. She appeared in two Test matches and four One Day Internationals for Australia in 1985, all against England. She played domestic cricket for Victoria.

When she was first selected for Australia, Napier was the captain of the University of Melbourne Cricket Club women's team.

References

External links
 
 
 Wendy Napier at southernstars.org.au

Living people
1957 births
People from Caulfield, Victoria
Australia women Test cricketers
Australia women One Day International cricketers
Victoria women cricketers